Standing in the Light, The Captive Diary of Catharine Carey Logan, is a Dear America novel written by Mary Pope Osborne. It was first published in 1998. The novel is set in Delaware Valley, Pennsylvania in 1763.

Plot summary

Catherine has always lived a simple life with her Quaker family. But when she and her brother are captured by Indians her whole world is turned upside down. She is adopted by an old woman and her daughter. The old woman lost her other daughter, Snow Bird, to measles. Initially, Catherine despises the Indians and is in anguish for her brother who was taken to live with another tribe. She yells at and insults the  Indians, until she gets dreams of her brother indicating  that he lives over the hill. She  decided to climb it, but first she had to cross an icy river. the ice broke, and she was saved by a hunter named Snow Hunter. She discovers  that he can speak English, and tells him of the dreams she had of her brother. The next day, Thomas was with her, but he was very  sick. Catherine and the old woman nurse him back to health. Catherine and Thomas start to develop close bonds with Snow Hunter and the other Indians,  Catherine especially. And then, one day the English attack their camp. They took Catherine  and Thomas  back to their original family, not knowing if Snow Hunter and the others are alive or not. This was especially hard for Catherine, because she  had grown to love Snow Hunter. She felt estranged  from her true family, and when  her father read her diary, she still was miserable eventually she adapted  to her true life but never forgot her experiences with the Lenape.

Main Characters
 Catherine
 Snow Hunter
 Thomas
 Little Cloud
 White Owl
 Little One 
 Mother
 Father

1998 American novels
American historical novels
American children's novels
Children's historical novels
Fiction set in 1763
Novels set in the 1760s
Novels set in Pennsylvania
Novels about race and ethnicity
American captivity narratives
Delaware Valley
1998 children's books